The eighth and final season of the sketch comedy series Portlandia premiered on IFC in the United States on January 18 and ended on March 22, 2018 with a total of 10 episodes. The series stars Fred Armisen and Carrie Brownstein.

Cast

Main cast
Fred Armisen
Carrie Brownstein

Special guest
Kyle MacLachlan as Mr. Mayor / Sean

Guest stars

Production
The series was originally renewed through 2017 with season 7 intended to be the last, but Armisen and Brownstein hinted at the possibility of doing season 8. On January 5, 2017, IFC renewed Portlandia for a 10-episode final season, ahead of the season 7 premiere. In addition to introducing new guests stars, Natasha Lyonne, Jeff Goldblum, Kumail Nanjiani and Kyle MacLachlan were announced to return as guests for the final season. Armisen admitted that writing the season was "tricky" due to the change in administrations and said that the rise of Donald Trump "changed the way [Armisen] looks at some of the characters." Production concluded on September 9, 2017.

Episodes

Reception
The eighth and final season received generally favorable reviews. On the review aggregator website Rotten Tomatoes, the season holds a score of 83%, based on 6 reviews. In his review for The A.V. Club, John Hugar praised the series finale for ending "on a high note, with a delightfully ridiculous episode that features the show’s off-beat humor at its finest." Melanie McFarland, writing for Salon, said that the finale "remains true to the core of the series and its devotion to the timelessness of its weirdness."

Ratings

References

External links 

 

Portlandia (TV series)